Eirias Park is a  public park in Colwyn Bay, Conwy County Borough, Wales, was once described as "The park by the sea". The park has a sports complex, including the Eirias Stadium and Colwyn Leisure Centre.

History

The park was created when the local council purchased  on 12 April, 1921 and the remainder of the park in 1929. The official opening of the playing fields took place on 27 September, 1923.

Situated within the park is the Colwyn Leisure Centre which was opened by Princess Margaret in 1981. Facilities include a six-lane 25-metre swimming/leisure pool with various water features and a separate water slide and the main sports hall. There is also a fitness suite, health suite, sauna, steam room and warm spa pool.

Outdoor facilities within the complex, includes Eirias Stadium which opened in 1955 and was redeveloped in 2011 and stages local and international sporting events, a floodlit synthetic hockey/football playing area. Additional facilities include indoor and outdoor tennis courts, bowling greens, boating lake, children's playground and picnic area.

References

Cycling in Wales
Tourist attractions in Conwy County Borough
Parks in Conwy County Borough
Colwyn Bay
Boating lakes

External links